Lady Walpole may refer to one of three relatives of British statesman, Robert Walpole:
 Catherine, Lady Walpole (1682–1737), first wife of Robert Walpole
 Maria, Lady Walpole (1702–1738), second wife of Robert Walpole
 Lady Elizabeth Walpole (1682–1736), sister of Robert Walpole

See also
 Baron Walpole, a title in the peerage of Great Britain